Candé-sur-Beuvron (literally Candé on Beuvron) is a commune in the Loir-et-Cher department in central France.

Geography
The Cosson river flows southwest through the middle of the commune, then flows into the Beuvron, which flows west through the southern part of the commune before flowing into the Loire, which forms the commune's western border.

The village lies between the Cosson and the Beuvron.

Population

See also
Communes of the Loir-et-Cher department

References

Communes of Loir-et-Cher